June's Picture Show is the second studio album by the pop-rock band Ingram Hill. It was voted best album of 2004 by Melodic.net.

The song "Will I Ever Make It Home?" was featured in the film 13 Going on 30.

Track listing
"Chicago"  
"Never Be The Same"  
"Slippin' Out"  
"Almost Perfect"  
"On My Way"  
"The Captain"  
"Will I Ever Make It Home"  
"Waste It All On You"  
"To Your Grave"  
"What If I'm Right"  
"Maybe It's Me"  
"Hangin' Around Again"

Personnel
Justin Moore - Lead vocals, Rhythm guitar 
Matt Chambless - Drums
Shea Sowell - Bass, backing vocals
Phil Bogard - Lead Guitar

2004 albums
Ingram Hill albums